Belize was represented at the 2006 Commonwealth Games in Melbourne. Belize won no medals at the 2006 Games, continuing the no-medal streak, since Belize started competing.

Team
Emma Wade - Women's 200m
Grogory Lovell - Cycling
Ian Smith - Cycling
Jayson Jones - Men's 100m & 200m
Kay Vaughn - Women's Triple Jump
Mateo Cruz - Cycling
Roger Troyer - Cycling
Tricia Flores - Women's Long Jump & 100m

External links
  Belize - Melbourne 2006
 Belize - Athlete Biographies - Melbourne 2006

News articles
 https://news.google.com/archivesearch?num=100&hl=en&safe=off&q=Belize+commonwealth-games&as_ldate=2006&as_hdate=2006&um=1&ie=UTF-8&scoring=t&sa=X&oi=archive&ct=title
 It's g'day to the fun and Games; The wizards of Oz will conjure up much-needed magic for the Melbourne spectacular, says Frank Malley.(Sport)
 New Roo Kasey quite a knockout

Belize at the Commonwealth Games
Nations at the 2006 Commonwealth Games
Commonwealth Games